James R. McFarland, American state senator from Arizona
James T. McFarland (1930-2015), American lawyer and politician from New York